Empire of the Obscene is the debut studio album by the American technical death metal band, Revocation. It was released in February 2008 under an independent label. This is the only Revocation album to be self-released, as the band was signed to Relapse Records in early 2009. The album was remixed, remastered and reissued in 2015 on Metal Blade Records, with Summon the Spawn EP as bonus material.

Track listing

Personnel
David Davidson - lead vocals, guitars
Anthony Buda - bass, backing vocal
Phil Dubois-Coyne - drums

References

2008 debut albums
Revocation (band) albums
Albums with cover art by Pär Olofsson